Wing Enterprises is an American company headquartered in Springville, Utah company, the largest American manufacturer of ladders as of 2005. The company produces the Little Giant Ladder System, a convertible aluminium ladder system. The founder of Wing Enterprises, Harold Ray "Hal" Wing, came across a prototype of the ladder in Germany in the 1970s. He licensed the ladder from the inventor, patented the design in the United States and began manufacturing the ladder in his home and selling it at trade shows.

Features
The ladder itself is capable of being converted into several heights and configurations from a single ladder.  Configurations include a straight or extension ladder, an A-frame ladder, a staircase ladder (an uneven A-frame for use on stairs), a 90° ladder, and both sides of a scaffolding trestle achieved through a triple locking hinge.  Each of the ladder positions has three heights in one ladder.  The ladder can achieve as many as 24 position/height permutations.  The ladder folds to a smaller size for storage. The ladder also has "tip-n-glide" wheels to facilitate movement and positioning.

The Ladder features flared legs for increased stability.  Locking, telescoping side rails allow the various height configurations.  Trapezoidal rungs create a stable standing surface. They are attached using "double zig-zag" welds.

Models

Little Giants

Type I
Industrial heavy duty 250 lbs rated
Available in Model 17 and Model 22

Type IA
Industrial extra heavy duty 300 lbs rated
Available in Model 13, Model 17, Model 22 and Model 26

Type IAA
Industrial special duty 375 lbs rated
Available in Model 13, Model 17 and Model 22

Ultra Step
Industrial extra heavy duty 300 lbs rated
Available in both aluminium and fibreglass versions
Adjustable from 5 to 8 feet as a single sided stepladder
Can be used in the parallel (or 90 degree) position against a wall

Industrial Little Giants

SkyScraper
Industrial extra heavy duty 300 lbs rated
Available in Model 15 (adjustable 8 to 15 feet), Model 17 (adjustable 9 to 17 feet), and Model 21 (adjustable 11 to 21 feet)

Little Giant Fibreglass
Industrial extra heavy duty 300 lbs rated
Made from a special high-quality non-conductive resin
Available in Model 17 and Model 22

Little Jumbo

Safety Step
Available in two-step, three-step and four-step models
Made from rugged, corrosion-resistant aluminium alloy
Collapse to 5-inch storage depth

References

"Tube time"

External links
Little Giant Ladders Official Site
Little Giant Ladder Authorized Retailer Site
Little Giant Ladder Video Review
Little Giant Ladder UK Official Site

Safety equipment
Manufacturing companies based in Utah
1970s establishments in Utah
Companies based in Utah County, Utah